Methylcoumarin is one of a series of isomers in which a methyl group substitutes for a hydrogen atom in coumarin. They all have formula C10H8O2 and molecular weight 160.172 g/mol.

References

Coumarins